Ciro Nieli is an American director, producer and designer of animated television series. He is known as the creator and executive producer of the animated series Super Robot Monkey Team Hyperforce Go!, and as the showrunner and executive producer of the 3D computer-animated series Teenage Mutant Ninja Turtles. He is also known as a director on seasons 1 and 2 of the animated series Teen Titans, and as one of the three developers of The Avengers: Earth's Mightiest Heroes.

References

External links 
 

Living people
Nationality missing
Year of birth missing (living people)
Super Robot Monkey Team Hyperforce Go!